Lü Ji may refer to:

King Yong Ji of Shang, recorded as Lü Ji in oracle bones
Duke Ding of Qi, personal name Lü Ji
Lü Ji (painter) (born 1477), Chinese painter of flower and bird works during the Ming Dynasty
Lü Ji (composer) (1909–2002), Chinese composer, writer on music, music educator, and administrator

See also
Lu Ji (disambiguation)